Hajjilar (also Romanized as Ḩājjīlār; also known as Aldzhilar, Aljīlar, Gheslagh Haji Lar Dizmar, Gūzī Ḩājjīlār, Ḩājīlār-e Gūney, Ḩājjīlar-e Gūnī, Ḩājjīlū, Qeshlāq-e Ḩājjīlār, Qeshlāq Ḩājelār, Qeshlāq Ḩājjīlār, Qeshlāq Kīājīlār, and Qishlāq Kiajilar) is a village in Arzil Rural District, Kharvana District, Varzaqan County, East Azerbaijan Province, Iran. At the 2006 census, its population was 86, in 20 families.

References 

Towns and villages in Varzaqan County